is a voice talent management firm in Japan founded  on 3 February 1981 (thus the year is the company's namesake). A hybrid CD-ROM featuring voice talent data for members of 81 Produce was released on 19 October 1997. The company is located in Shibuya, Tokyo.

Attached talent
All names are in Western order (given name followed by family/last name).

Male

Shigeru Chiba
Takuya Eguchi
Tesshō Genda
Wataru Hatano
Katsunosuke Hori
Naruhito Iguchi
Ryuzou Ishino
Hiroshi Ito
Kent Itō
Jun'ichi Kanemaru
Kunihiro Kawamoto
Arthur Lounsbery
Yuuki Matsuda
Shin-ichiro Miki
Kenta Miyake
Kōki Miyata
Yū Mizushima
Shigeru Mogi
Yoshiki Nakajima
Daiki Nakamura
Ryūsei Nakao
Kōtarō Nishiyama
Ryūsuke Ōbayashi
Tetsuharu Ōta
Soma Saito
Kōichi Sakaguchi
Toshiharu Sakurai
Nozomu Sasaki
Toshihiko Seki
Mitsuo Senda
Shigenori Sōya
Shunsuke Takeuchi
Kan Tanaka
Tomohiro Tsuboi
Hiroshi Tsuchida
Hidenari Ugaki
Hideyuki Umezu
Kousei Yagi
Takayuki Yamaguchi
Kiyoyuki Yanada
Kunihiko Yasui

Female

 Himika Akaneya
 Chinatsu Akasaki
 Yoshino Aoyama
 Yōko Asada
 Madoka Asahina
 Yoshiko Asai
 Kana Asumi
 Nanami Atsugi
 Sumie Baba
 Sachiko Chijimatsu
 Arisa Date
 Sayuri Hara
 Coco Hayashi
 Nene Hieda
 Rina Honnizumi
 Mako Hyōdō
 Tomoko Ishimura
 Masako Jō
 Rie Kanda
 Masako Katsuki
 Yuko Kobayashi
 Kaho Kōda
 Aoi Koga
 Chie Kōjiro
 Kujira
 Motoko Kumai
 Masayo Kurata
 Mayuki Makiguchi
 Miyu Kubota
 Kurumi Mamiya
 Yōko Matsuoka
 Ui Miyazaki
 Marie Mizuno
 Haruhi Nanao
 Chinami Nishimura
 Keiko Nemoto
 Rumi Ōkubo
 Kaya Okuno
 Misaki Sekiyama
 Yū Serizawa
 Chiyako Shibahara
 Emi Shinohara
 Anri Shiono
 Yuri Shiratori
 Noriko Shitaya
 Yumi Takada
 Rie Takahashi
 Minami Takayama
 Aimi Tanaka
 Minami Tanaka
 Megumi Toyoguchi
 Ayumi Tsunematsu
 Reina Ueda
 Rumiko Ukai
 Fushigi Yamada
 Erina Yamazaki
 Madoka Yonezawa
 Yukiji
 Ryōka Yuzuki
 Saki Yamakita
 Yū Serizawa
 Yūki Wakai
 Azuki Shibuya

Formerly attached talent

Male

 Masashi Ebara (currently affiliated with Aoni Production)
Yuzuru Fujimoto (deceased)
 Satoshi Goto (currently affiliated with Beckers Act)
Tetsuya Kakihara (currently affiliated with Zynchro) 
 Saburo Kamei (deceased)
 Kiyoshi Kawakubo (deceased)
 Iemasa Kayumi (deceased)
 Kaneta Kimotsuki (deceased)
 Issei Miyazaki (currently affiliated with TAB Production)
 Hidetoshi Nakamura (deceased)
 Tōru Ōhira (deceased)
 Hiroshi Ōtake (affiliated with Gin Production until his death)
 Takahiro Sakurai (currently affiliated with INTENTION)
 Daisaku Shinohara (deceased)
 Mahito Tsujimura (deceased)
Kyousei Tsukui (retired)
 Toshiya Ueda (deceased)
 Takeshi Watabe (deceased)

Female

 Runa Akiyama (deceased)
 Keiko Hanagata (deceased)
 Emiri Katō
 Miyu Matsuki (deceased)
 Tamaki Nakanishi (deceased)
 Masako Nozawa (currently affiliated with Aoni Production)
 Ai Shimizu (currently affiliated with Haikyō)
 Kaoru Shimamura (deceased)
 Asako Shirakura (currently affiliated with Aqua Place)
 Kumiko Takizawa (deceased)
 Kazuko Yanaga (deceased)

References

External links
  

Japanese voice actor management companies
Mass media companies established in 1981
Talent agencies based in Tokyo
Mass media companies based in Tokyo
1981 establishments in Japan